Victoria Independent School District is a public school district based in Victoria, Texas, United States.

VISD serves the city of Victoria and the unincorporated community of McFaddin. Middle and high school students from the community of Nursery may choose between Victoria ISD or Cuero Independent School District.

In 2009, the school district was rated "academically acceptable" by the Texas Education Agency.

Schools

High schools
Grades 9-12
Victoria East High School
Victoria West High School

Middle schools
Grades 6-8
Howell Middle School
Cade Middle School
Patti Welder Middle School
Stroman Middle School

Elementary schools
Grades K-5
DeLeon Elementary School
Guadalupe Elementary School
Mission Valley Elementary School
William Wood Elementary School
Grades PK-5
Aloe Elementary School
Chandler Elementary School
Crain Elementary School
Dudley Magnet School
F.W. Gross Montessori Magnet School
Hopkins Magnet School
Juan Linn Magnet School
O'Connor Magnet School
Rowland Magnet School
Schorlemmer Elementary school
Shields Magnet School
Smith Magnet School
Torres Elementary School
Vickers Elementary School

Other Campuses
Career & Technical Institute (Grades 9-12)
Juvenile Justice Center (Grades 5-12)
Mitchell Guidance Center (Grades 6-12)
Liberty Academy (Grades 9-12)
Victoria Area Center for Advanced Learning (Grades 9-12)

Construction Projects
In May 2007, voters approved a $159 million bond package that called for the construction of new schools as well as renovation of existing campuses. Five new campuses  - two elementary, one middle, and two high schools - were constructed as a part of this bond measure. The elementary school sites are located at 4208 Lone Tree Road and 2654 Mallette Drive. These schools opened at the start of the 2009-2010 school year. The new middle school and two high schools opened the following year. The Stroman Campus of Memorial High School became the Victoria Area Advanced Learning Center, offering middle and high school students higher level courses in a centralized location. The Memorial High School Senior Campus will became the district's events center. Memorial Stadium is located on this site as well as a quality track, tennis courts, dressing rooms for multiple sports, and an agricultural farm with classroom facilities. A new auditorium and natatorium, included in the overall bond package, were also constructed on the site.

References

External links
 

School districts in Victoria County, Texas